UltraTech Cement Limited is an Indian cement company based in Mumbai. It is the largest manufacturer of grey cement, ready-mix concrete (RMC) and white cement in India with an installed capacity of 116.75 million tonnes per annum. It is the only company in the world to have a capacity of over 100 million tonnes in a single country, outside of China.

History 
In February 2016, Bombay High Court rejected UltraTech's plan to acquire two cement plants from Jaiprakash Associates. In 2015 the court passed the Mines and Mineral Development and Regulation Act after which the company began to make plans to acquire several cement plants as a whole by acquiring Jaiprakash Associates.

Operations 

UltraTech Cement has 23 integrated plants, 1 clinkerisation plant, 26 grinding units and 7 bulk terminals. Its operations span across India, UAE, Bahrain and Sri Lanka.

In the white cement segment, UltraTech goes to market under the brand name of Birla White. It has a white cement plant with a capacity of 0.68 MTPA and 2 WallCare putty plants with a combined capacity of 0.85 MTPA.

With 100+ Ready Mix Concrete (RMC) plants in 39 cities, UltraTech is the largest manufacturer of concrete in India.

Mergers and acquisitions 
2013 - Acquired Jaypee Group's Gujarat cement unit for 3,800 cr.

2017 - Acquired Jaiprakash Associates's six integrated cement plants for 16,189 cr.

2018 - Entered into a scheme of arrangement with Century Textile and Industries to demerge Century's cement business into ultratech.

Nov 2018 - Acquired Binani Cement for 7,266 cr.

References

External links
 

Cement companies of India
Manufacturing companies based in Mumbai
Manufacturing companies established in 1983
Aditya Birla Group
NIFTY 50
Indian brands
BSE SENSEX
1983 establishments in Maharashtra
Indian companies established in 1983
Companies listed on the National Stock Exchange of India
Companies listed on the Bombay Stock Exchange